Jurkowo may refer to the following places:
Jurkowo, Greater Poland Voivodeship (west-central Poland)
Jurkowo, Kuyavian-Pomeranian Voivodeship (north-central Poland)
Jurkowo, Giżycko County, Warmian-Masurian Voivodeship (north Poland)
Jurkowo, Olecko County, Warmian-Masurian Voivodeship (north Poland)